Maxixe is the largest city and economic capital of the province of Inhambane, Mozambique. It is situated on the Indian Ocean at 23°52′S 35°23′E just south of the Tropic of Capricorn, in a bay opposite historic Inhambane City which can be reached by local ferries.  Although Maxixe is the province's principal city, Inhambane City is the seat of the provincial government.

By road the distance to Inhambane is far longer and is approximately 60 kilometres.

Maxixe serves as a convenient stop for transportation heading North or South along the EN1.

Demographics

References

Populated places in Inhambane Province